Konstantinos Pollux Alexandros "Dino" Stamatopoulos (born December 14, 1964) is an American writer, producer, and actor. He has worked on TV programs such as Mr. Show, TV Funhouse, Mad TV, The Dana Carvey Show, Late Show with David Letterman, and Late Night with Conan O'Brien. He has also created multiple animated TV shows such as Moral Orel, Mary Shelley's Frankenhole, and High School USA!. As an actor, he is best known for his recurring role as the character Alex "Star-Burns" Osbourne on the NBC comedy series Community, on which he also worked as a producer and consulting writer.

Early life

Stamatopoulos was born into a Greek-American family in Norridge, Illinois as Konstantinos Pollux Alexandros Stamatopoulos.  He attended Ridgewood High School in Norridge, where he wrote for his school variety show and was astounded that he could get laughs with the material he had written. While attending Columbia College Chicago, he performed a duo act with comedian Andy Dick, in which Stamatopoulos played a ventriloquist and Dick played a dummy under the influence of sleeping pills.

Career
Stamatopoulos was hired on The Ben Stiller Show after Andy Dick convinced him to submit a spec script for a Simpsons episode. There, he met and worked with Bob Odenkirk. After Stiller's show was canceled, he moved to New York City, where he wrote during the 1990s for The Dana Carvey Show, Late Night with Conan O'Brien (also with Odenkirk), Late Show with David Letterman, and Mr. Show with Bob and David.

In 2000 Stamatopoulos and Robert Smigel pitched Comedy Central a spin-off of Smigel's TV Funhouse cartoons (which were appearing singly as animated shorts on Saturday Night Live episodes) as a half-hour sketch comedy show. The standalone TV Funhouse show premiered in 2000 but was canceled after one season. He later joined the writing staff on Mad TV.

Stamatopoulos worked as a creative consultant and contributing writer on the first season of Tom Goes to the Mayor, with Tim & Eric and Bob Odenkirk. He also provided the voice of Drinky Crow on The Drinky Crow Show, which aired for one season on Adult Swim. His stop motion animated series Moral Orel premiered on Adult Swim on Christmas 2005 and aired for three seasons, airing its final episode in December 2008; a follow-up special aired in 2012. Following Moral Orel, Stamatopoulos created Mary Shelley's Frankenhole, a stop motion series, for Adult Swim. It ran for two seasons from 2010 to 2012.

Stamatopoulos was a writer and producer on the 2009 NBC sitcom Community. He also played the recurring role of Alex "Star-Burns" Osbourne, a character whose nickname derived from his large star-shaped sideburns and his tendency to define himself by them. Together with Community creator Dan Harmon, Stamatopoulos started production company Starburns Industries.

A long-time fan of radio personality Steve Dahl, Stamatopoulos hosted a podcast, Sorry About Everything, from May 2012 until June 2013 on Dahl's Steve Dahl Network.

Stamatopoulos and friend Andy Dick hosted a weekly podcast, Dino and Andy's Skull Juice, which premiered in late 2016 and was initially produced by Feral Audio. Due to an on-air incident of hostility in mid-2018, Dick was asked to leave the podcast. Stamatopoulos asked friend and recurring guest Dana Snyder to replace Dick as co-host, and the podcast was renamed Dino & Dana's Safe Space. Additional co-hosts Laetitia "Tish" Burns and Spencer Crittenden were also given billing in the podcast.

Personal life
Stamatopoulos was married and has one daughter. He is a vocalist and guitarist in a rock band called Sorry About Everything.

Filmography

Film

Television

References

External links 
 
 
 TV Squad interview with Dino Stamatopoulos

1964 births
American male comedians
American male screenwriters
American sketch comedians
American television writers
Television producers from Illinois
American male voice actors
Primetime Emmy Award winners
Living people
Male actors from Chicago
Writers from Chicago
American people of Greek descent
American writers of Greek descent
American male television writers
People from Norridge, Illinois
Screenwriters from Illinois
Comedians from Illinois
21st-century American comedians
21st-century American screenwriters
21st-century American male writers